The Revengers is the name of different fictional teams appearing in American comic books published by Marvel Comics.

Publication history
The Revengers is a fictional team of supervillains who were formed to fight A-Next in the MC2 series A-Next. They were created by Tom DeFalco and Ron Frenz.

The Revengers is also the name of a comical parody of The Avengers in Earth-665, the setting of Marvel's parody comic Not Brand Echh.

In September 2011, an Earth-616 version of the Revengers led by Wonder Man appears. They were created by Brian Michael Bendis.

Fictional team history

MC2

After a tragic mission that claimed the life of several Avengers including Hank Pym and the Wasp, their children were furious to see A-Next, a team of heroes referred to by people as the "next generation of Avengers". The children of Hank Pym and Wasp used their parents' technology to replicate their powers. The daughter Hope Pym duplicated her mother's powers as the Red Queen while her brother Henry Pym Jr. copied his father's powers as Big Man.

Red Queen also helped create an energetic villain called Ion Man, whom she sent to kill Mainframe. Although he failed (unknowingly, since Mainframe was later rebuilt), he passed her test. Red Queen soon added more villains to her fold (Spider-Girl's nemesis, Killerwatt, and Wild Thing's homicidal half-brother Sabreclaw). She waited until the members of the Avengers were at their most vulnerable before sending her team, the Revengers, to destroy them. Red Queen herself wanted to personally torture Stinger, as she felt that Stinger dishonored her parents' memories, but the reserve members of A-Next defeated the Revengers and Big Man turned himself in, stopping his crazed sister, as Big Man did not want to be a killer.

However, in Last Planet Standing, the Revengers returned with the aid of Magneta to fight A-Next again. The fight was halted when Galactus came to destroy Earth. A-Next teamed up with a number of other heroes while the Revengers got away, minus Sabreclaw, who stayed behind to help fight and later joined A-Next to help fill out their roster.

Cancerverse
In the Cancerverse reality of Earth-10011, the Revengers were that reality's version of the Avengers who were corrupted by that reality's version of Captain Marvel who turned them into servants of the Many-Angled Ones. They were allies with the Defenders of the Realm and the Ex-Men. The Revengers were all destroyed when Thanos brought Death to this Deathless reality.

Earth-616

In 2011, another version of the Revengers appear in the Earth-616 universe. Formed by Wonder Man (whose ionic energy leaking problem has caused him to become convinced that the Avengers are not helping the world and that he must stop them), it consists of lesser-known heroes who he has convinced to help him as this antihero group. During the Revengers attack on Avengers Mansion where they fought the New Avengers, Ms. Marvel tries to reason with Wonder Man which doesn't work. This team manages to defeat the New Avengers and they move on to attack Stark Tower. Wonder Man has Atlas attack Stark Tower to get their attention upon calling a press conference. After failing to reason with Wonder Man, Iron Man trapped him in a stasis container. When the Avengers do not want to fight with so many civilians nearby, Thor teleports the Revengers to Citi Field and all three teams (the main Avengers, the New Avengers, and the Secret Avengers) gang up on the Revengers all at once. With the Revengers imprisoned at the Raft, each member has been interrogated with Captain America, Thor, and Iron Man watching the video feed of the interrogation. Beast later visits Wonder Man in his stasis container. Wonder Man insists that he is acting of his own free will and remains steadfast in his claim that the Avengers must disband before more people are hurt. He also adds something new: his realization that Scarlet Witch created him and that he probably is not even real. Appealing to their friendship, Wonder Man tries to extract a promise from Beast to shut the Avengers down when he realizes that Wonder Man is in the right, but a distressed Beast walks away. Various news programs are buzzing about the Avengers' lack of transparency and stonewalling tactics. Some openly speculate that the time for a self-appointed hero team is over and done. In his bubble, Wonder Man smiles and vanishes into a white light.

New Revengers
As part of the All-New, All-Different Marvel, Maker of W.H.I.S.P.E.R. assembles a new incarnation of the Revengers dubbed the New Revengers with plans to have them face the New Avengers. They consist of Asti the All-Seeing, Paibok, Vermin, White Tiger, and alternate versions of Angar the Screamer and Skar.

During the Civil War II storyline, the New Revengers gain City's O.M.N.I.T.R.O.C.U.S form as its latest member. At the time when A.I.M. was facing off against S.H.I.E.L.D., Maker took advantage of this by sending his New Revengers to attack them. While O.M.N.I.T.R.O.C.U.S. kept Sunspot trapped in his office while having his own defense system attack him, Angela del Toro fought with her aunt Ava Ayala while the other Revengers members attacked the rest of the New Avengers and the staff of Avengers Base Two. Donning a variation of Pepper Potts' Rescue armor, Toni Ho managed to slay the alternate Skar. Also, Mockingbird managed to get free from O.M.N.I.T.R.O.C.U.S.' clutches with the help of Warlock while Ava broke Angela free from the combined influences of the Tiger God and the Hand. The remaining members of the New Revengers faced off against the New Avengers and the rest of the A.I.M. staff. While the remaining members of the New Revengers were defeated, Maker got away.

Roster

MC2 version
 Ion Man - An ionic-powered villain created by Red Queen. Ion Man has the power to fly and fire blasts of destructive energy.
 Killerwatt - Electrically powered enemy of Spider-Girl, Killerwatt's wicked sense of humor is made less funny by his tendency to fire lightning bolts at the people he tells his jokes to.
 Magneta - Obsessed fan of Magneto who abandoned her dreams of being a hero and uses her own magnetic powers to help the Red Queen fight A-Next.
 Red Queen - Daughter of Henry Pym and the Wasp, Hope Pym copied her mother's electric sting blasts and insect-wings and donned a sinister version of her mother's Wasp costume. She is the team leader and has a pathological hatred of Stinger.

Former members
 Sabreclaw - Hudson Logan is the son of Wolverine and the half-brother to Wild Thing. His healing factor and deadly claws are made more frightening by his sociopathic nature. He later joined A-Next.
 Big Man - Brother to Red Queen, Henry Pym Jr. copied his father's growing abilities. Big Man joined the team to watch over his sister.

Earth-616 version
 Wonder Man - Leader
 Anti-Venom - Anti-Venom joined up with the Revengers because he thought Wonder Man might be right about what he claims about the Avengers.
 Atlas - Atlas joined up with the Revengers out of anger that his numerous requests to join the Fifty State Initiative were denied.
 Captain Ultra - Captain Ultra joined up with the Revengers where despite being part of the Fifty State Initiative, he resented being disrespected despite having as much power as an Avenger.
 Century - Century sided with Wonder Man out of sense of honor to him and recognition of the cycle of life where he previously blamed himself for Wonder Man's previous death and wanted to make amends.
 Demolition Man - Demolition Man claimed the Grandmaster called him to reclaim the Infinity Gems from the Avengers and that the Avengers have not been returning his calls, leading him to be recruited into the Revengers. This happened while he was suffering from brain damage.
 Devil-Slayer - He joined the Revengers in order to make a reality where the Avengers were held accountable for their actions.
 Ethan Edwards - He joined the Revengers in order to avenge the defeat of the Skrulls at the end of their Secret Invasion.
 Goliath V - He joined the Revengers where he still blames Iron Man for his uncle Bill Foster's death at the hands of Ragnarok.

New Revengers
 Maker - Leader
 White Tiger - 
 Paibok - 
 Asti the All-Seeing - 
 Skar - This version was taken from an as-yet-unidentified reality.
 Angar the Screamer - This version was taken from an as-yet-unidentified reality.
 Vermin - 
 O.M.N.I.T.R.O.C.U.S -

In other media

Television
A variation of the Revengers appears in the Avengers Assemble episode "Ant-Man Makes It Big" consisting of the Human-Ant, Iron Guy, Colonel America, the Bulk, Dark Spider and the Viking King seen in the in-universe film Human Ant and the Revengers.

Film
The Revengers is the name of a team that appears in the Marvel Cinematic Universe 2017 film Thor: Ragnarok. The team is assembled by Thor out of necessity to escape the Grandmaster's domain and includes Thor himself, Valkyrie, the Hulk and Loki, with Korg and Miek as associates. Thor appears to make up the name on the spot as he tries to reason that they all want revenge, though Bruce Banner claims that he is "undecided", Thor knowing that they can't use the proper term of Avengers as that name is taken, with himself and Banner as founding members. After making it to Asgard and confronting Hela who makes short work of them, Thor quips that they should probably disband the Revengers.

References

External links
 Revengers (Earth-616) at Marvel.com
 Revengers (MC2) at Marvel Wiki
 Revengers (Cancerverse) at Marvel Wiki
 Revengers (Earth-616) at Marvel Wiki
 New Revengers at Marvel Wiki
 Revengers (Earth-616) at Comic Vine

Marvel Comics 2
Marvel Comics teams
Characters created by Ron Frenz
Characters created by Brian Michael Bendis
Characters created by Tom DeFalco
Fictional characters from parallel universes